Hard Men is a 1997 British crime gangster black comedy film directed by J. K. Amalou. A forerunner to Lock, Stock And Two Smoking Barrels, it was originally shown at the London Film Festival on 28 October 1996. It was released in cinemas on 28 February 1997.

Synopsis
The plot resolves around three friends Tone (Vincent Regan), Speed (Lee Ross) and Bear (Ross Boatman) working as debt collectors on behalf of notorious crime boss Pops Den (Mad Frankie Fraser). Tone discovers he has a baby daughter and decides to retire from gangster life. Pops Den subsequently orders Bear and Speed to kill Tone and to deliver his hand at 9am the following day. The story shows the fears that Bear and Speed have, while trying to think of a way to kill Tone by giving him one last big night to remember.

Reception
Hard Men received mixed reviews. Loaded gave the film a positive review and went on to say "In a nutshell, The Krays meets Reservoir Dogs." On the other hand Variety wrote a negative review, as they felt that the "Film has a consistently interesting look on an obviously meagre budget, with atmospheric use of grungy London locations and much use of close-ups in dialogue sequences. The latter, unfortunately, only serve to emphasize the script’s weaknesses."

References

External links
 
 

1996 films
1996 action comedy films
1990s crime comedy films
British crime comedy films
1990s English-language films
1990s British films